Trond Botnen (30 November 1937 – 21 January 2019) was a Norwegian printmaker, painter, sculptor and poet.

Botnen was born in Porsgrunn to Olav S. Botnen and Snefried Gudbrandsen. He resided in Drøbak. He attended the 
Norwegian National Academy of Craft and Art Industry  and made his  debut exhibition in 1963.

He is represented at the National Gallery in Oslo, at the Norwegian Museum of Contemporary Art, at Trondheim Kunstmuseum, Lillehammer Art Museum and other galleries. His poetry collections include Nattordbok from 1970 and Gruver Toms hytte from 1971.

References

1937 births
2019 deaths
People from Porsgrunn
People from Frogn
20th-century Norwegian painters
Norwegian male painters
21st-century Norwegian painters
Norwegian printmakers
Norwegian sculptors
Norwegian male poets
20th-century Norwegian male artists
21st-century Norwegian male artists
20th-century Norwegian male writers
21st-century Norwegian male writers